Arsenic triselenide is an inorganic chemical compound with the chemical formula .

Amorphous arsenic triselenide is used as a chalcogenide glass for infrared optics. When purified, it transmits light with wavelengths between ca. 0.7 and 19 µm.

In arsenic triselenide, arsenic is covalently bonded to selenium, where arsenic has a formal oxidation state of +3, and selenium −2.

Solution processed thin film 

Thin film selenide glasses have emerged as an important material for integrated photonics due to its high refractive index, mid-IR transparency and high non-linear optical indices. High-quality  glass films can be deposited from spin coating method from ethylenediamine solutions.

References

Arsenic(III) compounds
Selenides
Optical materials
Non-oxide glasses